Hiroden Streetcar route #9 is a streetcar route operated by the Hiroshima Electric Railway. It runs between Hatchobori Station and Hakushima Station. Around five to six trips per day continue to Eba Station via the Hiroden Main Line and Hiroden Eba Line.

Overview

Lines
Hiroden Streetcar route #9 runs on the Hiroden Hakushima Line. A few trips continue via the Hiroden Main Line and Hiroden Eba Line.

Stations

References

9